The Women's 15 km Free competition of the Vancouver 2010 Paralympics is held at Whistler Olympic Park in Whistler, British Columbia. The competition took place on Sunday, March 14 and Monday, March 15.

Medal summary

Medal table

Medalists

Visually Impaired
In the cross-country skiing 15 km Free visually impaired, the athlete with a visual impairment has a sighted guide. The two skiers are considered a team, and dual medals are awarded.

Sitting (10 km)

Standing

References

External links
2010 Winter Plympics schedule and results , at the official website of the 2010 Winter Paralympics in Vancouver

Men's 20 km Free
Para